Bawe is a coastal village in  Central Papua, Indonesia. It is located near the border with West Papua province. Nearby villages include Wakobi which is located 1.8 km to the east, and Armini which lies 2 km to the west.

References

Villages in Central Papua